Bonne nouvelle is the seventh studio album by Canadian singer Natasha St-Pier. The limited release, only on Vente-privee website, was on 11 June 2012 and wider release of the album is on 9 July 2012, including digital and physical album. The first single, "Bonne nouvelle", was released from the album on 30 January 2012.

The album has thus far been significantly less successful than her previous works.

Track listing 
All songs written by Siméo except where noted.

Canadian bonus track

2012 albums
Natasha St-Pier albums
Columbia Records albums